BRAHMA Force: The Assault on Beltlogger 9, known in Japan as , and in Europe as BRAHMA Force, is a video game developed by Genki for the PlayStation in 1996-1998. It was announced by Genki as the official successor to their Kileak series.

Reception

The game received favorable reviews according to the review aggregation website GameRankings. Next Generation said, "The variety of weapons, the intelligence of level design, and the perfect degree of difficulty all combine to make BRAHMA Force a surprisingly good game." In Japan, Famitsu gave it a score of 30 out of 40.

Notes

References

External links
 

1996 video games
First-person shooters
Genki (company) games
Jaleco games
PlayStation (console) games
PlayStation Network games
Video games about mecha
Video games developed in Japan